The 1997–98 ECHL season was the tenth season of the ECHL.  Before the start of the season, the league saw the Knoxville Cherokees move to Florence, SC and welcomed expansion teams in New Orleans, LA and Upper Marlboro, MD.  The Louisiana IceGators finished the regular season first overall and the Hampton Roads Admirals won their record setting third overall ECHL championship (1st Kelly Cup), defeating the Pensacola Ice Pilots 4 games to 2.

League realignment
With the league expanding to 25 teams, the Board of Governors decided to divide the league into two conference (Northern and Southern), with two divisions each.  With the realignment the Board of Governors also created two new trophies, one each for the playoff champion of each conference.

Northern Conference

Northeast Division
Chesapeake Icebreakers
Hampton Roads Admirals
Johnstown Chiefs
Richmond Renegades
Roanoke Express
Wheeling Nailers

Northwest Division
Columbus Chill
Dayton Bombers
Huntington Blizzard
Louisville RiverFrogs
Peoria Rivermen
Toledo Storm

Southern Conference

Southeast Division
Charlotte Checkers
Jacksonville Lizard Kings
Pee Dee Pride
Raleigh Icecaps
South Carolina Stingrays
Tallahassee Tiger Sharks

Southwest Division
Baton Rouge Kingfish
Birmingham Bulls
Louisiana IceGators
Mississippi Sea Wolves
Mobile Mysticks
New Orleans Brass
Pensacola Ice Pilots

Regular season

Final standings
Note: GP = Games played; W = Wins; L= Losses; T = Ties; GF = Goals for; GA = Goals against; PTS = Points; Green shade = Clinched playoff spot; Blue shade = Clinched division; (z) = Clinched home-ice advantage

Northern Conference

Southern Conference

Kelly Cup playoffs

Bracket

Northern Conference

Quarterfinals

Semifinals

Finals

Southern Conference

Quarterfinals

Semifinals

Finals

Kelly Cup finals

ECHL awards

References

See also
 ECHL
 ECHL All-Star Game
 Kelly Cup
 List of ECHL seasons

ECHL seasons
ECHL season, 1997-98